Hermetia crabro is a species of soldier fly in the family Stratiomyidae.

Distribution
Guatemala, Honduras.

References

Stratiomyidae
Insects described in 1886
Taxa named by Carl Robert Osten-Sacken
Diptera of North America